Taylor Hicks is the eponymous major label debut album by the American Idol fifth-season winner of the same name. The album was released on December 12, 2006 in the United States by Arista Records in association with 19 Recordings Limited, nearly seven months after Hicks won the reality-talent competition in May. Hicks coined the phrase "modern whomp" to describe the album's sound—an amalgam of soul, blues, funk, and Cajun influences with a contemporary twist. The first single from the album was the ballad "Just to Feel That Way".

The album debuted at the number two spot on the U.S. Billboard 200 chart, selling 298,000 copies in its first week. Within one month of its release, Taylor Hicks was certified platinum by the Recording Industry Association of America for shipping over one million copies.  However, over a year later it had reached sales of only about 700,000 copies, making it the second lowest selling debut album by an American Idol winner, after Kris Allen and Lee DeWyze's debuts. The album has sold 704,000 copies as of December 2010.

Album background
Recording for the album took six weeks, between October to November 2006, right after the culmination of the American Idols LIVE! Tour. The album, Hicks's first full-length endeavor, includes contributions from Bryan Adams, Diane Warren, and Rob Thomas, as well as a few of Hicks's originals which have appeared on his previous self-produced effort Under the Radar. Producer Matt Serletic had only heard about Taylor Hicks for the first time when he was approached for the Idol winner's project.

Collaborations with other artists such as Robert Randolph and John Mayer were mentioned by Hicks in interviews, but failed to materialize due to scheduling problems and the goal to release the album before Christmas. Hicks had also been invited by the estate of Ray Charles to record at Charles's own historic 2107 West Washington Boulevard Studio (a.k.a. 2107-RPM) in Los Angeles, but those plans also had to be postponed until a future album. Hicks would have been the first person to record in the studio since Charles himself.

Fan blog Gray Charles, under contract with Hicks and his record company, gradually released first-hand details of the album, with Hicks providing weekly updates via audio blog. "The Runaround" was the first track premiered on Gray Charles on November 21, followed by "Dream Myself Awake" and "The Right Place", even before they were made available on Hicks's official website and MySpace page. The full album was made available for preview on the VH1 website on December 5.

"The Runaround" was originally intended to be the first single released from the album, and Hicks performed the song on The Tonight Show with Jay Leno and The Martha Stewart Show in the run-up to the album's release. Instead, "Just to Feel That Way" was announced as the first "official" single after nearly two months. Hicks admitted that fan reaction to the album contributed to the decision. His second single release was "Heaven Knows" The album's singles, "Just to Feel That Way" and "Heaven Knows" peaked at #20 and #19 respectively on Billboard's Hot Adult Contemporary Tracks chart.

Critical reception

Taylor Hicks garnered mixed reviews from critics. AllMusic's Stephen Thomas Erlewine gave high praise to the record's balancing of modern adult contemporary pop and throwback retro soul throughout the track listing, Matt Serletic for capturing the "lived-in warmth" of Hicks' performances, and Hicks for selling both genres with "enough personality", highlighting the soulful tracks made by the studio pros ("The Right Place", "The Runaround") and Hicks himself ("Soul Thing", "The Deal"), concluding that "he's created an album that fits all of American Idols requirements -- it's big, clean, catchy and commercial -- without losing his own identity, so he's sneaked blue-eyed soul back into the mainstream. But he never would have gotten this chance if American Idols huge audience didn't recognize that he had this talent and if they didn't realize that he was making music that they had forgotten to hear, and fortunately, 19 Entertainment, in turn, realized this and let Taylor Hicks make an album that will surely satisfy anybody who loved to hear him on the show, and an album that stands as one of the best Idol-related records yet made." Mike Joseph of PopMatters praised Serletic for translating Hicks' "good-natured and earnest" Idol personality onto record and Hicks for elevating even the weaker songs by adding enough "emotional investment" to his performance without any histrionics, concluding that: "While the hipster-types will hate on sight, Taylor Hicks is a solid album of meat-and-potatoes music. With a smart blend of rock & soul not seen since the days when Hall & Oates ruled MTV, the grey haired dude with the spastic dance moves has actually made one of the better albums to sprout from the American Idol machine." Ann Powers of the Los Angeles Times felt that the "speedily produced" debut was filled with "store-bought stuff" that didn't display Hicks' musical stylings like his own originals, concluding that: "Maroon 5 is doing blue-eyed soul better right now, but Hicks, who's not as artistically mature as his back story suggests, could get there. He just needs some more real blues." Entertainment Weekly writer Henry Goldblatt felt the album was hampered by Hicks' "limited vocal range" being centered and taking away any joy and energy the tracks had. Elysa Gardner of USA Today wrote that: "The mostly generic tunes provided by a predictable posse of studio vets include a few surprisingly savvy showcases for Hicks' gray-haired soul shtick. Alas, a pair of hokey originals should dispel any notions of the crooner as a budding troubadour."

Track listing

Notes
 "Soul Thing", "The Deal" and "Hell of a Day" are reworkings of the original version from Hicks's previous album Under the Radar (2005); the latter also contains an additional verse.

Sample credits
 "Heaven Knows" contains samples from "What'd I Say" by Ray Charles and "Ain't That Peculiar" by Marvin Gaye

Personnel
Credits adapted from the album's liner notes.

Vocals

 Kara DioGuardi – background vocals 
 Nikisha Grier – background vocals 
 Taylor Hicks – background vocals 
 Judith Hill – background vocals 
 Tom Leonard – background vocals 
 Jason Morales – background vocals 

 Josef Powell – background vocals 
 Louis Price – background vocals 
 Matt Serletic – background vocals 
 Matt Tryggestad – background vocals 
 Oren Waters – background vocals 
 Terry Young – background vocals 

Instrumentation

 Leland Sklar – bass 
 Paul Bushnell – bass 
 Reggie Hamilton – upright bass , electric bass , bass 
 Chris Bruce – bass, guitar 
 James Harrah – guitar 
 Rusty Anderson – guitar 
 Greg Leisz – lap steel solo , pedal steel 
 Stevie Blacke – cello, lap steel , strings 
 Jamie Muhoberac – clavinet , organ , piano 
 Matt Serletic – keyboards , piano , percussion , Wurlitzer 
 Patrick Warren – keyboards 
 Kevin Kadish – organ 

 Greg Adams – trumpet 
 Lee Thornburg – trumpet 
 Eric Marienthal – tenor saxophone 
 Johnnie Bamont – tenor saxophone, baritone saxophone 
 Nicholas Lane – trombone 
 Taylor Hicks – harmonica , marching drums 
 Lenny Castro – percussion 
 Alex Richbourgh – programming 
 Pete Davis – programming 
 John O'Brien – programming 
 Curt Bisquera – drums 
 The Weekend Warrior's Drum Corps – marching drums 

Technical

 Serban Ghenea – mixing 
 David Thoener – mixing 
 Greg Collins – additional engineering
 Jess Sutcliffe – additional engineering
 Patrick Woodward – additional engineering

 Erik Reichers – assistant engineer 
 Kevin Mahoney – assistant mix engineer 
 Tim Roberts – assistant mix engineer 
 Brent Paschke – digital editing
 Stephen Marcussen – mastering

Imagery

 Jane Morledge – creative direction and design
 Charlie Becker – additional design
 Chris LeBeau – art production

 Jim Wright – photography
 Chris Ehrlich – styling
 Rhea Willis – grooming

Charts

Weekly charts

Year-end charts

Certifications

References

2006 debut albums
Taylor Hicks albums
19 Recordings albums
Arista Records albums
Albums produced by Cory Rooney
Albums produced by Matt Serletic